Fairview is an unincorporated community in Armstrong County, Texas, United States. According to the Handbook of Texas, the community had a population of 75 in 2000. The community is part of the Amarillo Metropolitan Statistical Area.

History
A church in Washburn was used by Methodists until a church was built in the community in 1902. It was used until 1948. A community center was built in the community after Fairview joined the Texas Rural Neighborhood Improvement program in 1953. Its population was 75 in 2000.

Geography

Education
Fairview's first school was established in 1892 and was moved twice until being moved to its present site in 1912. Sam G. Bratton, a United States Senator from New Mexico, was one of the first teachers at the school. The local Methodist congregation moved to the school's auditorium after it joined the Claude Independent School District in 1948. The community continues to be served by the Claude ISD to this day.

References

Unincorporated communities in Armstrong County, Texas
Unincorporated communities in Texas
Unincorporated communities in Amarillo metropolitan area